Wilhelmina Iris Winifred Hasbach ("Iris Hoey") (17 July 1885 – 13 May 1979) was a British actress in the first half of the twentieth century, both on stage and in movies.

Early life
Iris Hoey was born in London, daughter of Wilhelm Anton Hasbach, a professor of political economy.

Career
In the early part of her career, Hoey alternated performances in straight theatre alongside Beerbohm Tree with musical comedy with George Edwardes; she appeared in minor musical roles in Les P'tites Michu and the 1906 revival of The Geisha.

Her first film appearance was in East Lynne (1922), an adaptation of the 1861 sensation novel by Mrs Henry Wood; during her busiest period of film work (the 1930s), in 1934 she appeared in the West End in the play Mary Read.

Personal life
Hoey married first, in 1911, Mashiter ("Max") Leeds (1883-1937), of Spring Grove, Bishopstoke, Hampshire, grandson of Sir Joseph Edward Leeds, 2nd baronet; they were divorced in 1922, having had a son, Joseph Mashiter Leeds (born 1912).

She married Cyril Raymond in 1922; on 4 December 1923, their son, John North Blagrave Raymond (1923-1977), was born in Bristol; he was a journalist and literary editor of the New Statesman.

Filmography

External links

References

1885 births
1979 deaths
English stage actresses
English film actresses
Actresses from London
20th-century English actresses